The Rhythmic Music Conservatory is a music conservatoire in Copenhagen, Denmark. The RMC was founded in 1986 as an independent institution of higher education under the Danish Ministry of Culture and is the only school in Denmark specializing in contemporary music training programmes.

In 2005, it appointed British musician and composer Django Bates as Professor of Rhythmic Music.

External links
 Rhythmic Music Conservatory

Music schools in Denmark
Performing arts education in Copenhagen
Culture in Copenhagen
Educational institutions established in 1986
1986 establishments in Denmark